Matet de Leon-Estrada (born October 4, 1984 as Maria Nora Ana Theresa Villamayor) is a Filipina actress who began her career as a child star. She is an adopted daughter of Christopher de Leon and Nora Aunor.

Filmography

Film

Television

External links

References

1983 births
Living people
ABS-CBN personalities
Actresses from Manila
M
Filipino film actresses
Filipino women comedians
GMA Network personalities